Thomas Lancaster (died 1583) was an English Protestant clergyman.

Thomas Lancaster may also refer to:

Thomas Lancaster (died 1610), politician, MP for West Looe (UK Parliament constituency)
Thomas William Lancaster (1787–1869), vicar of Banbury and fellow of Queen's College, Oxford
Thomas Percival Lancaster (1877–1968), newspaper publisher and political figure in Ontario
Thomas, 2nd Earl of Lancaster (1278–1322), one of the leaders of the baronial opposition to Edward II of England

See also